Cost of Living is a progressive rock album released in 1983 by British keyboard player Rick Wakeman. Actor Robert Powell provided narration on the last track of the album.

The track on the album called "Gone But Not Forgotten" was played at a memorial service for Countdown host Richard Whiteley shortly after his death. The voice at the very start of "Bedtime Stories" is that of Rick Wakeman's son (Benjamin). He was just 3 years old at the time of the recording.

Track listing 
All music by Rick Wakeman; all lyrics by Tim Rice
 "Twij" –  1:20
 "Pandamonia" – 3:58
 "Gone But Not Forgotten" – 3:43
 "One For The Road" – 4:44
 "Bedtime Stories" – 4:23
 "Happening Man" – 3:35
 "Shakespeare Run" – 3:27
 "Monkey Nuts" – 3:26

 "Elegy - Written in a Country Churchyard" — 8:24

Rick's Perspective
Notes
"Another nearly album. It has too much variation within the music for me to be really happy about it and again I ended up in a studio that I really didn't like that was picked by the record company at the time and so I couldn't change. There's a mixture of great playing and some very poor playing as well. Most disappointing is the piano sound as the piano in the studio was cheap and nasty. There are a couple of classic tracks on the album though such as Happening Man which I would love to re-record one day."

Personnel 
 Rick Wakeman - keyboards
 Hereward Kaye - vocals
 Jackie McAuley - guitar
 John Gustafson - bass
 Robert Powell - narration
 Tony Fernandez - drums, percussion
Technical
Ken Thomas, Mike Stent - engineer

References 

1983 albums
Rick Wakeman albums
Charisma Records albums